De Vere is a surname. Notable people with the surname include:

Aubrey de Vere I (died c. 1112), a tenant-in-chief in England of William the Conqueror
Aubrey Thomas de Vere (1814–1902), an Irish poet and critic
Cecil Valentine De Vere (1845–1875), a British chess player
Clémentine de Vère (1888-1973), British magician and illusionist 
Edward de Vere, 17th Earl of Oxford (1550–1604), Lord Great Chamberlain to Elizabeth, also believed by some to have penned Shakespeare's works
Harry De Vere (1870–1923), an American silent film actor
Mary de Vere (died c. 1624), an English noblewoman
Michael De Vere (born 1976), an Australian rugby league footballer
Pearl de Vere (c. 1862–1897), a brothel owning madam of the American Old West
Robert de Vere, Duke of Ireland (1362–1392), a companion and advisor to Richard II of England
Stephen de Vere (1812–1904), an Irish Member of Parliament

See also
De Vere family, an English aristocratic family that includes several of the individuals listed above, and many others listed in that article
De Vere baronets, a title in the Baronetage of Ireland
Henry De Vere Stacpoole (1863–1951), an Irish author
Lady Clara Vere de Vere, an English poem written by Alfred Tennyson
De Vere Group, a British hotel and leisure business
De Vere Society, a British group supporting the Oxfordian theory of Shakespeare authorship
The De Vere Belfry, a hotel in England
Chase de Vere Investments plc or its successor company Chase de Vere Financial Solutions plc, at the time, a subsidiary of Bristol and West
Richard DeVere, a fictional character played by Peter Bowles in the British sitcom To the Manor Born
Aubrey De Vere (disambiguation)
Vere (disambiguation)